Admiral Sir William Jock Whitworth,  (29 June 1884 – 25 October 1973) was a senior Royal Navy officer who served as Second Sea Lord and Chief of Naval Personnel from 1941 to 1944.

Naval career
Whitworth joined the Royal Navy as a cadet in 1899, and was on 15 January 1901 posted to the battleship HMS Ocean, as she was sent to the China station during the Boxer Rebellion.

He then became commanding officer at the Physical and Recreational Training School in Portsmouth in 1926. He was given command of HMS Stuart and the 2nd Destroyer Flotilla of the Mediterranean Fleet in 1928.

In 1933 Whitworth was appointed Captain of the Fleet to the Commander-in-Chief, Mediterranean Fleet and in 1936 he took command of the battleship . He was made Naval Secretary in 1937.

Whitworth served in the Second World War and commanded the Battlecruiser Squadron in 1939. He participated in the Norwegian Campaign and in 1940, with his flag flying in the battleship , he led the Royal Navy to victory at the second Battle of Narvik off Norway. Later in 1940 he returned to the Battlecruiser Squadron. He was made Second Sea Lord and Chief of Naval Personnel in 1941 and Commander-in-Chief, Rosyth in 1944. He retired in 1946.

Family

In 1910 Whitworth married Marguerite MacLean.

References

External links
 The Dreadnought Project page on Whitworth

|-

|-

|-

|-

1884 births
1973 deaths
Knights Commander of the Order of the Bath
Companions of the Distinguished Service Order
Royal Navy admirals of World War II
Lords of the Admiralty
Admiralty personnel of World War II
Military personnel from Kent